Lilley is a small village and civil parish situated between Hitchin and Luton in Hertfordshire, England. Lilley stands on high ground: nearby Telegraph Hill is just over 600 feet above sea level.

The church, rebuilt in the 19th century, contains some original features and a fine Elizabethan heraldic memorial. According to tradition, Lilley was once the residence of John Kellerman, an alleged occultist described by Sir Richard Phillips as the "last of the alchemists."

Lilley lies within the parliamentary constituency of Hitchin and Harpenden. Until recently it had two public houses, the Silver Lion and the Lilley Arms.  The recent closure and conversion of the Silver Lion leaves the Lilley Arms as the village's only pub. The low-lying land to the south of Lilley is called Lilley Bottom.

The Icknield Way Path passes the edge of the parish on its 110-mile course from Ivinghoe Beacon in Buckinghamshire to Knettishall Heath in Suffolk.

The village has a football team, although they presently do not play in Lilley due to lack of facilities.  The village cricket club is one of the oldest in Hertfordshire, with fixtures dating back to the mid-1890s.  The cricket club plays at the Geoff Banks-Smith Memorial Cricket Ground, between St Peter's Church and the village hall and are currently in North Herts League Division 2.

The church holds a flower festival every early May Bank Holiday weekend.

References

External links

Villages in Hertfordshire
Civil parishes in Hertfordshire